John Douglas, 7th Marquess of Queensberry (1779 – 19 December 1856), styled Lord John Douglas from May to December 1837, was a Scottish Whig politician.

Early life
Queensberry was the son of Sir William Douglas, 4th Baronet (died 16 May 1783), and his wife, Grace (née Johnstone) who died 25 March 1836, and succeeded his elder brother, Charles (1777–1837), in the marquessate in December 1837.

Career
The same year he was appointed a Lord-in-waiting (government whip in the House of Lords) in the Whig administration of Lord Melbourne, a position he held until the government fell in 1841. Between 1837 and 1850 he also served as Lord-Lieutenant of Dumfriesshire.

Personal life
On 16 July 1817, Douglas married Sarah (died 13 November 1864), daughter of James Sholto Douglas. They had two children :

 Archibald William Douglas, 8th Marquess of Queensberry (1818–1858), who married Caroline Margaret Clayton, daughter of Gen. Sir William Clayton, 5th Baronet, in 1840.
 Georgiana Douglas (born in 1819)

Lord Queensberry died on 19 December 1856 and was succeed in the marquessate by his only son, Archibald.

Descendants
Through his son Archibald, he was a grandfather of Lady Gertrude Georgiana Douglas (who married Thomas Stock), John Sholto Douglas, 9th Marquess of Queensberry, Lord Francis William Bouverie Douglas, Reverend Lord Archibald Edward Douglas, Lady Florence Caroline Douglas, and Lord James Edward Sholto Douglas (who married racehorse breeder Martha Lucy Hennessy).

References 

1779 births
1856 deaths
John Douglas, 7th Marquess of Queensberry
Lord-Lieutenants of Dumfries
Marquesses of Queensberry